In library and information science, the information search process (ISP) is a six-stage process of information seeking behavior. The ISP was first suggested by Carol Kuhlthau in 1991.
It describes the thoughts, feelings and actions of the searcher, and is often used to describe students.

Stages

Stage 1: Initiation
During the first stage, initiation, the information seeker recognizes the need for new information to complete an assignment. As they think more about the topic, they may discuss the topic with others and brainstorm the topic further. This stage of the information seeking process is filled with feelings of apprehension and uncertainty.

Stage 2: Selection
In the second stage, selection, the individual begins to decide what topic will be investigated and how to proceed. Some information retrieval may occur at this point, resulting in multiple rounds of query reformulation. The uncertainty associated with the first stage often fades with the selection of a topic, and is replaced with a sense of optimism.

Stage 3: Exploration
In the third stage, exploration, information on the topic is gathered and a new personal knowledge is created. Students endeavor to locate new information and situate it within their previous understanding of the topic. In this stage, feelings of anxiety may return if the information seeker finds inconsistent or incompatible information.

Stage 4: Formulation
During the fourth stage, formulation, the information seeker starts to evaluate the information  that has been gathered. At this point, a focused perspective begins to form and there is not as much confusion and uncertainty as in earlier stages. Formulation is considered to be the most important stage of the process. The information seeker will here formulate a personalized construction of the topic from the general information gathered in the exploration phase.

Stage 5: Collection
During the fifth stage, collection, the information seeker knows what is needed to support the focus. Now presented with a clearly focused, personalized topic, the information seeker will experience greater interest, increased confidence, and more successful searching.

Stage 6: Search closure
In the sixth and final stage, search closure, the individual has completed the information search. Now the information seeker will summarize and report on the information that was found through the process. The information seeker will experience a sense of relief and, depending on the fruits of their search, either satisfaction or disappointment.

References

External links
Kuhlthau's Model of the Stages of the Information Process, retrieved December 5, 2017. Archived from the original on August 27, 2021, retrieved February 15, 2022.
The 'information search process' revisited: is the model still useful?, retrieved October 15, 2010.

Information science